Maharashtra State Highway 1, commonly referred to as MH SH 1, is a normal state highway that runs south through Nandurbar, Dhule and Jalgaon districts in the state of Maharashtra.  This state highway touches numerous cities and villages VIZ. Shahada, Sangvi, Lasur and Amalner.

Summary

Distance Chart

Route description 
Below is the brief summary of the route followed by this state highway.

Nandurbar District

Shahada Taluka

Dhule District

Shirpur Taluka

Jalgaon District

Chopda Taluka 
This Highway also covered the areas of chopda Taluka. In Chopda Taluka The villages that are covered under this highway are following Budhagaon, Galwade, Hated  kH, Galangi and Velode.

Amalner Taluka

Major Junctions

National Highways

State Highways

Connections 
Many villages, cities and towns in various districts are connected by this state highway.

Nandurbar District

Dhule District

Jalgaon District

References 

State Highways in Maharashtra